Panzgam is a village in Awantipora tehsil of Pulwama district, Jammu and Kashmir, India. It is located at the boundary of Awantipora Tehsil.Most beautiful and reputated village in pulwama.

References

External links 
 Swarnim Vijay Varsh Victory Mashaal reaches south Kashmir’s Shopian
 IED detected in J&K's Pulwama district | India News – India TV
 Civilian Killed in Protests as Kashmiris Try to Make Their Way to Riyaz Naikoo s Village
 Jammu and Kashmir: Militants attack CRPF camp in Pulwama
 Protests in Pulwama: South Kashmir erupts as 3 top militants killed
 Unidentified gunmen shot dead ‘IS-JK’ militant in Srinagar
 Pulwama: Panzgama-Malangpora road in dilapidated conditions
 DDC Pulwama visits AIIMS site, takes stock of dev works

Villages in Pulwama district